Marc Daunis (born 22 April 1955) is a member of the Senate of France.  He represents the Alpes-Maritimes department, in Provence-Alpes-Côte d'Azur and is a member of the Socialist Party.

References
Page on the Senate website

1955 births
Living people
French Senators of the Fifth Republic
Socialist Party (France) politicians
Senators of Alpes-Maritimes